Kasper is a masculine given name which may refer to:

 Kasper Andersen (born 1984), Danish race car driver
 Kasper Pedersbæk (Born 1986), Danish second class citizen
 Kasper Bøgelund (born 1980), Danish retired footballer
 Kasper Fisker (born 1988), Danish footballer
 Kasper Hakunti (born 1988), Finnish curler
 Kasper Hämäläinen (born 1986), Finnish footballer
 Kasper Hjulmand (born 1972), Danish football manager and former player
 Kasper Hvidt (born 1976), Danish handball goalkeeper
 Kasper Jørgensen (handballer) (born 1977), Danish handballer
 Kasper Winther Jørgensen (born 1985), Danish rower
 Kasper Kusk (born 1991), Danish footballer
 Kasper Nielsen (born 1975), Danish team handball player
 Kasper Niesiecki (1682–1744), Polish heraldist, Jesuit, lexicographer, writer, theologian and preacher
 Kasper Ødum (born 1979), Danish badminton player
 Kasper Pedersen (born 1993), Danish footballer
 Kasper Povlsen (born 1989), Danish footballer
 Kasper Risgård (born 1983), Danish footballer
 Kasper Schmeichel (born 1986), Danish football goalkeeper
 Kasper Skaanes (born 1995), Norwegian footballer
 Kasper Søndergaard (born 1981), Danish handball player
 Bjørn Kasper Ilaug (:no) (born 1958), Norwegian hero

See also
 Kaspar
 Casper

Danish masculine given names
Estonian masculine given names
Norwegian masculine given names